Erick Chauluka (born 9 September 1983) is a Zimbabwean cricketer.

Career
Chauluka is a member of the Takashinga Cricket Club in Harare, and captained the club in 2007.

Domestic career
Chauluka made his first-classdebut for Manicaland in the 2002–03 Logan Cup, being dismissed for a duck in both innings. He switched to Mashonaland for the 2003–04 season, scoring 231 runs in four matches at an average of 33.00 playing mainly as an opener, including his maiden first-class century against Midlands. He also made his List A debut in the 2003–04 Faithwear Inter-Provincial Competition, scoring 70 runs on his debut against Manicaland batting at #3, which remains his highest List A score. He switched to Midlands for the 2004–05 season, playing four first-class and two List A matches.

No first-class matches were played in the 2005–06 Zimbabwean domestic cricket season due to the Zimbabwean cricket crisis. Chauluka did, however, represent Zimbabwe A in two matches against Bangladesh A in June 2006, scoring 63 runs.

Chauluka was selected to play for Centrals after the first re-structuring of Zimbabwean cricket. He played five first-class and three List A games as captain of the side in the 2006–07 season, scoring 203 runs in the Logan Cup, the most for Centrals in that season. He also played three further first-class matches and one List A match for Zimbabwe A against Kenya Select and South Africa A in the 2006–07 and 2007–08 seasons. Chauluka also played several matches for the Zimbabwe Provinces in the 2007–08 South African domestic season.

References

External links

1983 births
Centrals cricketers
Manicaland cricketers
Mashonaland cricketers
Midlands cricketers
Sportspeople from Harare
Southern Rocks cricketers
Zimbabwean cricketers
Living people